The 28th Armoured Brigade was an armoured brigade formation of the British Army, raised during the Second World War.

History

In 1939, it started off as the 2nd Armoured Reconnaissance Brigade. After the Dunkirk evacuation, with the lack of Armoured vehicles, it was converted into the 3rd Motor Machine Gun Brigade on 1 December 1940. As more equipment became available, it was eventually converted into the 28th Armoured Brigade and served in the United Kingdom throughout the war, under the command of the 9th Armoured Division. It was disbanded on 21 August 1944, without having seen active service as a unit.  However, its constituent Armoured Regiments would see service in the Northwest Europe Campaign, replacing units disbanded by heavy losses.

Order of battle
 5th Royal Inniskilling Dragoon Guards (left 13 July 1944)
 15th/19th The King's Royal Hussars (left 20 June 1944)
 1st Fife and Forfar Yeomanry (left 20 August 1944)
 2nd Battalion, Queen Victoria's Rifles (redesignated 8th Battalion, King's Royal Rifle Corps 15 January 1941)
 8th Battalion, King's Royal Rifle Corps (left 10 July 1944)

Commanders
 Brigadier H. Lumsden (until 15 October 1941)
 Brigadier E.S.D. Martin (from 15 October 1941 until 30 October 1942)
 Brigadier H.R. Mackeson (from 30 October 1942 until 5 August 1944)
 Lieutenant-Colonel A.D. Taylor (acting, from 5 August 1944 until 13 August 1944)
 Lieutenant-Colonel W.G.N. Walker (acting, from 13 August 1944)

See also

 British Armoured formations of World War II
 List of British brigades of the Second World War

Notes

References

External links
 

Armoured brigades of the British Army
Military units and formations established in 1940
Military units and formations disestablished in 1944
Armoured brigades of the British Army in World War II